Campbell Avenue Historic District is a national historic district located in Springfield, Missouri, United States. The district encompasses 11 contributing buildings in a commercial section of Springfield. The district developed between about 1885 and 1948, and it includes representative examples of Italianate and Colonial Revival style architecture.  Notable buildings include the McLaughlin Block (c. 1890) and Busy Bee Department Store (c. 1915).

It was added to the National Register of Historic Places in 1999 with a boundary increase in 2005.

References

Historic districts on the National Register of Historic Places in Missouri
Italianate architecture in Missouri
Colonial Revival architecture in Missouri
Buildings and structures in Springfield, Missouri
National Register of Historic Places in Greene County, Missouri